Vinyl Cafe Diaries (2003) is Stuart McLean's fourth volume of stories that first aired on the CBC Radio program The Vinyl Cafe.  It made the 2004 Stephen Leacock Award for Humour shortlist, and was the winner of the 2004 Canadian Authors Association Award.

Stories included in Vinyl Cafe Diaries:
Walking Man
Dave and the Duck
Tree of Heaven
Lazy Lips
Labour Pains
Birthday Present
Rashida, Amir and the Great Gift-Giving
Book Club
A Night to Remember
Dorm Days
Best Things
Christmas on the Road
Field Trip
No Tax on Truffles
Gifted
Planet Boy

See also
List of Dave and Morley stories

References

External links
Stuart McLean profile at cbc.ca
The Vinyl Cafe website

2003 short story collections
Short story collections by Stuart McLean